William Crosfield (1838 – 17 May 1909) was a British Liberal Party politician who served as the Member of Parliament for Lincoln, Lincolnshire in the 25th Parliament between 1892 and 1895.

A Congregationalist, William Crosfield was head of the sugar firm of Messrs. George Crosfield and Company. He was a member of the Mersey Docks and Harbour Board, and took an interest in civic and philanthropic organizations in Liverpool. He died suddenly of apoplexy at Liverpool Town Hall on 17 May 1909.

References

External links 
 Hansard

1838 births
1909 deaths
Liberal Party (UK) MPs for English constituencies
UK MPs 1892–1895
People from Lincoln, England